The CubCrafters Carbon Cub EX (EX - Experimental) is an American amateur-built aircraft, designed and produced by Cub Crafters of Yakima, Washington. The aircraft is supplied as a kit for amateur construction.

Design and development
The design is related to the company's CubCrafters Carbon Cub SS light-sport aircraft, but adapted to the US experimental amateur-built category.

The aircraft's airframe is made from welded steel tubing, aluminum and the judicious use of carbon fiber, covered in doped aircraft fabric. Construction time from the supplied kit ranges from 700 to 1100 hours (Depending on builder experience).

In August 2022, a new engine option was introduced, the  CC363i F/P, equipped with a constant-speed propeller.

Operational history
By December 2016 four examples had been registered in the United States with the Federal Aviation Administration and six with Transport Canada.

Variants
Carbon Cub EX-2
Kit built variant
CubCrafters EX-2 363i
Kit version introduced in December 2022 with a Lycoming/CC 363i  engine.
Carbon Cub EX-3
Kit built variant with a Superior Air Parts CC363i engine and increased gross weight.
Carbon Cub FX-2
Factory-builder assist variant
Carbon Cub FX-3 
Factory-builder assist variant with a Superior Air Parts CC363i engine and increased gross weight.

Specifications (Carbon Cub EX)

References

External links

Homebuilt aircraft
Cub Crafters aircraft
Single-engined tractor aircraft
High-wing aircraft